(often simplified to , sometimes styled ) was the designated red light district in Kyoto, and was later also a geisha district. Established in 1640, Shimabara, following the outlawing of sex work in Japan became defunct as a red-light district in the 1950s; by the 1970s, no geisha were registered in Shimabara. , who never disappeared entirely from Shimabara, were allowed to register as a special type of geisha following the outlawing of prostitution, and continue to perform in the district to this day. Shimabara continues to operate as a tourist district, and operates one .

History 

Shimabara was established in 1640 for a brothel owned by Hara Saburoemon and was closed (as a prostitution district) in 1958, when prostitution was outlawed in Japan, though it continued as a geisha district into the 1970s. There are many explanations for the name Shimabara; it may refer to the large gate that resembled the gate of Shimabara Castle in Hizen, or may be a reference to the then-recent Shimabara Rebellion (1637–38) (which was provoked by the construction of the castle), due to the chaotic founding of Shimabara. In the Tokugawa period, it was also called  or simply "the quarter" to distinguish the higher-class residents within from the unlicensed women who operated throughout the cities.

Shimbara was one of the three districts known as  established in the major cities of Japan by the Tokugawa shogunate to restrict prostitution to designated districts. These districts were Shimabara in Kyoto (established 1640), Shinmachi in Ōsaka (established 1624–1644) and Yoshiwara in Edo (established 1617). These restrictions and controls were designed to control the widespread male and female prostitution of the Edo period (1603–1868). They did not derive from a moral opposition to prostitution but out of a desire to compartmentalize certain types of activity within the cities. Kabuki and  theatres, and other related entertainment establishments were similarly controlled.

The Meiji restoration and resulting move of the imperial court to Tokyo caused economic difficulties to many traditional businesses in Kyoto that catered to the aristocracy. While the other five  adapted and have continued to this day, Shimabara entered a slow decline over the following hundred years, finally ceasing as a geisha district in the 1970s, though traditional activities continue at a low level to the present. This decline is largely attributed to Shimabara's isolation — it was originally established on the outskirts of town and remains relatively isolated and inconvenient, compared to the other districts, which are more centrally located.

This was staged from 1873 to 1880 but ceased in 1881, together with a general decline in the dancing of the district. The dance hall was established in 1873, moved to another location in 1927, but after World War II (post-1945) it was instead used as offices and was eventually torn down in 1996.

Status 
While it remained active as a  until the 1970s, it is now largely defunct, without a resident geisha population and with no active ; where the district's dance hall once stood is now a nursing home.

Sights 
The main gate at the east and the two tea houses (Wachigaiya and Sumiya) form the three main attractions; though a few additional sights remain – a shrine, a historical ginkgo tree (and associated shrine), and stone markers (seven in all), mostly indicating ruins (such as the remains of the former west gate, where the dance hall once stood, etc.). A map is available in front of Sumiya.

Sumiya 
Sumiya is the center of tourism in the area and is operated as a museum , showing the secular culture of the Edo period. Sumiya is one of the very few non-temple, non-shrine and non-palace buildings in Kyoto to survive from the Edo period. It is the only remaining former  (a restaurant and establishment for entertainment in the pleasure quarters) and is the largest  in Kyoto. Unlike most , which are generally narrow, Sumiya has a large frontage on the street. This is because it consists of three buildings, purchased over the years. The middle is the oldest, dating to the founding in 1641 (or rather relocation of existing business to Shimabara), while the north part was acquired second (1673–80, approximately 30 years after founding), and the south part was acquired last (1787, over 100 years later). The pine great hall burnt down in a small fire in 1925, but the rest of the building is original. Many parts of the compound have been designated as important cultural properties, starting in 1952.

It is open about half the year, during the tourist season, from mid-March to mid-July and again mid-September to mid-December. The first floor is open on a walk-up basis, while the second floor requires advance registration for guided tours (in Japanese) given a few times per day. The first floor of the museum features a large back garden, a small inner garden, three tea houses, a large banquet hall facing the back garden that could fit up to 100 people (main location where parties were held), a smaller banquet hall facing the inner garden, and a vast kitchen, together with exhibits. The back garden contains a racked gravel bed (rock garden) and a trellised (pergola) pine tree (second generation, about 100 years old).

There are many details, such as a sword rack and sword chest where katana were checked to prevent violence – guests placed their sword on the rack, and it was then moved to the chest. There are paintings, most significantly Plum Blossoms by Buson, with other colorful paintings in the pine room, and records of the menus, which were paid for on a "bill afterwards" basis. In addition to housing many fine paintings, it was a salon for noted haiku poets, and many poems are preserved in the archives.

The second floor features three linked front rooms, each of different designs; these could be connected by removing the doors for larger parties. There are many paintings on the partitions, which have become stained with the soot of centuries of candles. In one room the paintings have not been cleaned, so the pictures are not very visible, but the age is; in another the paintings were cleaned a century ago, showing an intermediate state; while there are more recent paintings which are unstained and brilliantly colored. At the south end there is a recessed raised stage for musicians to perform; they entered by a side door from a side corridor. There are two smaller middle rooms, and the highest-ranked room is in the back, away from the street and overlooking the garden, separated from the livelier party below. In the past this provided a view of the western mountains and Arashiyama, though it is now blocked by the JR line and, hence, covered by trees. This high-ranked room is decorated in mother-of-pearl inlay, in a Chinese-inspired style that was popular circa 1800, and is the only surviving room in this style. Unusually, the work is signed, reflecting the skill and prestige of the artist.

They frequently partied there, eventually running up such high bills that they were forbidden (by leadership) from going there any further. Violent incidents occurred – a leader was about to be murdered on one occasion (later on the way back to their home, he was assassinated), while on another a member of the force slashed at the pillars out of anger pressed for delinquent payment, leaving three gouges, which remain to this day. Conversely, it was used by reformers such as Saigō Takamori for fund-raising parties.

It continued to operate the pine room as an entertainment space until 1985, when it closed after 345 years in business. In 1989 the Sumiya preservation society was founded, and in 1998 the museum opened.

Wachigaiya 
Wachigaiya continues to operate as an  – geisha from other districts entertain there, as do  – and as such is not open to the public.

Location 
Proceeding west, Hanayachō ends and the street turns north then west again, where one exits past a marker indicating the ruins of the former west gate, and then faces the JR West Sagano Line (section of Sanin Main Line). The closest rail station is Tambaguchi Station on the Sagano line.

Narrowly speaking, the district is on the east-west axis of Hanayachō (between the two gates), crossed by three north-west streets, and extended one block north and south (to the next east-west cross streets). These four streets were repaved with traditional field stones in the early 2010s, evoking the atmosphere of yesteryear. The actual south boundary slightly further south than the paving zone – there are two close parallel east-west streets at the south end, and the paving extends only to the northern one, while the traditional boundary was at the southern one.

References 

Geography of Kyoto
Sexuality in Japan
Red-light districts in Japan